Lovehunter is the second studio album by British band Whitesnake, released in 1979. It charted at No. 29 on the UK Albums Chart.

"Long Way from Home", the leading track on the album reached No. 55 on the UK charts.

It was the group's last album to feature original drummer Dave Dowle.

Cover art
Lovehunter'''s controversial cover art, showing a naked woman straddling a large snake, was created by fantasy artist Chris Achilleos. It was the last album cover he designed for many years, until 2003 and Gary Hughes' rock opera Once and Future King Part I. The original Lovehunter artwork was stolen in the 1980s.

A similar idea had been used three years earlier for the cover of Jon Lord's Sarabande album. Lord was in Whitesnake at the time of Lovehunter.

Track listing
Side one
"Long Way from Home" (David Coverdale) – 4:58
"Walking in the Shadow of the Blues" (Coverdale, Bernie Marsden) – 4:26
"Help Me Thro' the Day" (Leon Russell) – 4:40
"Medicine Man" (Coverdale) – 4:00
"You 'n' Me" (Coverdale, Marsden)'' – 3:25

Side two
"Mean Business" (Coverdale, Micky Moody, Marsden, Neil Murray, Jon Lord, Dave Dowle) – 3:49
"Love Hunter" (Coverdale, Moody, Marsden) – 5:38
"Outlaw" (Coverdale, Marsden, Lord) – 4:04
"Rock 'n' Roll Women" (Coverdale, Moody) – 4:44
"We Wish You Well" (Coverdale) – 1:39

Bonus tracks
Lovehunter was remastered and reissued in 2006 with several bonus tracks taken from Andy Peebles BBC Radio 1 sessions recorded 29 March 1979 (tracks originally from the band's debut album Trouble).
"Belgian Tom's Hat Trick" (Moody) – 3:40
"Love to Keep You Warm" (Coverdale) – 3:30
"Ain't No Love in the Heart of the City" (Michael Price, Dan Walsh) – 4:54
"Trouble" (Coverdale, Marsden) – 4:30

Personnel

Whitesnake
David Coverdale – lead (all but track 8) and backing vocals
Micky Moody – guitars, slide guitar, backing vocals
Bernie Marsden – guitars, backing vocals, lead vocals on track 8
Neil Murray – bass guitar
Dave Dowle – drums
Jon Lord – keyboards

Production
Martin Birch - producer, engineer, mixing at Central Recorders Studio, London
Chris Achilleos - LP artwork

Charts

Album

Singles
Long Way from Home

References

Whitesnake albums
United Artists Records albums
1979 albums
Albums produced by Martin Birch
Polydor Records albums
Hard rock albums by English artists
Blues rock albums by English artists